Reproductive justice  is a critical feminist framework that was invented as a response to United States reproductive politics. The three core values of reproductive justice are the right to have a child, the right to not have a child, and the right to parent a child or children in safe and healthy environments. The framework moves women's reproductive rights past a legal and political debate to incorporate the economic, social, and health factors that impact women's reproductive choices and decision-making ability.

Reproductive justice is "the human right to maintain personal bodily autonomy, have children, not have children, and parent the children we have in safe and sustainable communities," according to SisterSong Women of Color Reproductive Justice Collective, the first organization founded to build a reproductive justice movement. In 1997, 16 women-of-color-led organizations representing four communities of color – Native American, Latin American, African American, and Asian American – launched the nonprofit SisterSong to build a national reproductive justice movement. Additional organizations began to form or reorganize themselves as reproductive justice organizations starting in the early 2000s.

Reproductive justice, distinct from the reproductive rights movements of the 1970s, emerged as a movement because women with low incomes, women of color, women with disabilities, and LGBTQ+ people felt marginalized in the reproductive rights movement. These women felt that the reproductive rights movement focused primarily on "pro-choice" versus "pro-life" (supporters versus opponents of abortion rights) debates. In contrast, the reproductive justice movement acknowledges the ways in which intersecting factors, such as race and social class, limit the freedom of marginalized women to make informed choices about pregnancy by imposing oppressive circumstances or restricting access to services, including but not limited to abortion, Plan B pills, and affordable care and education. Reproductive justice focuses on practical access to abortion rather than abortion rights, asserting that the legal right to abortion is meaningless for women who cannot access it due to the cost, the distance to the nearest provider, or other such obstacles.

The reproductive justice framework encompasses a wide range of issues affecting the reproductive lives of marginalized women, including access to: contraception, comprehensive sex education, prevention and care for sexually transmitted infections, alternative birth options, adequate prenatal and pregnancy care, domestic violence assistance, adequate wages to support families, and safe homes. Reproductive justice is based on the international human rights framework, which views reproductive rights as human rights.

Founders 
The term reproductive justice combines reproductive rights and social justice. It was coined and formulated as an organizing framework by a group of Black women who came together for that purpose in 1994 and called themselves Women of African Descent for Reproductive Justice. They gathered in Chicago for a conference sponsored by the Illinois Pro-Choice Alliance and the Ms. Foundation for Women with the intention of creating a statement in response the Clinton administration's proposed plan for universal health care. The conference was intentionally planned just before the attendees would be going to the International Conference on Population and Development in Cairo, which reached the decision that the individual right to plan one's own family must be central to global development. The women developed the term as a combination of reproductive rights and social justice, and dubbed themselves Women of African Descent for Reproductive Justice.  They launched the framework by publishing full-page statement titled "Black Women on Universal Health Care Reform" with 800+ signatures in The Washington Post and Roll Call addressing reproductive justice in a criticism of the Clinton health care plan. The women who created the reproductive justice framework were: Toni M. Bond Leonard, Reverend Alma Crawford, Evelyn S. Field, Terri James, Bisola Marignay, Cassandra McConnell, Cynthia Newbille, Loretta Ross, Elizabeth Terry, 'Able' Mable Thomas, Winnette P. Willis, and Kim Youngblood.

Key features and concepts

Going beyond individual "choice" and "rights" 
The reproductive justice framework was developed in response to the limitations of the reproductive rights framework, which has become the globally dominant framework for working with reproductive issues in policy, programming, and scholarship. Activist women of color had grown frustrated with centering of "choice" and individual rights in the dominant reproductive rights paradigm, as articulated in appeals to "the right to choose" or "my body, my choice" in debates about abortion. This assumes that all women have an equal ability to make the same choice, but  ignores structural factors such as economic status, race, immigration state, etc.

Using the term reproductive justice instead of pro-choice, reproductive rights, or reproductive health, is a rhetorical choice. Robin West, professor of law and philosophy at Georgetown, says that "pro-choice" court cases may have been lost because of how the issue was framed. For instance, she argues that "rights" rhetoric gives courts, specifically the Supreme Court, immense rhetorical power. Reproductive health often places power in the hands of doctors, medical professionals, and the ability to access clinics. In this view, rights and health both refer to power being given to the people from a top-down perspective. As a response, the term justice is meant to put power back into the hands of the people.

Although distinct from pro-choice frameworks, reproductive justice advocates typically rely on narrative as a rhetorical strategy to mobilize consensus. These narratives centralize women's stories and decision-making. Narratives relying on public memory of feminist movements link women's stories across time and space and help people to understand the movement's reasons for organizing. This facilitates personal connection with otherwise abstract policy decisions, and puts a human face on political issues. While feminist narratives emphasize women's stories and experiences, reproductive justice narratives focus on the stories specifically of women of color, treating those with lived experience as experts on the challenges they face. For social justice issues, narratives operate on two levels: individual narratives as a rights-gaining strategy and narratives about social justice or activist movements. The reproductive justice movement challenges the right to privacy framework established by Roe v. Wade that was predicated on the notion of choice in reproductive decision-making. Essentially, the reproductive justice framework turns the focus from civil rights to human rights. The human rights approach of reproductive justice advocates the right of reproductive decision-making as inalienable for all marginalized women, regardless of their circumstances. In contrast, reproductive justice advocates argue that the civil rights-based, pro-choice framework centers on the legal right to choose abortions without addressing how socioeconomic status impacts the choices one has. Rickie Solinger said "the term rights often refers to the privileges or benefits a person is entitled to and can exercise without special resources," whereas the privacy framework established by Roe and interpreted by the Supreme Court in Maher v. Roe, holds that "the state is not obligated to provide the means for women to realize their constitutionally protected rights, but only to refrain from putting any 'obstacles' in their 'path'". The reproductive justice movement seeks to secure women's reproductive rights by attempting to abolish the civil rights foundation created by Roe, which has not addressed issues of abortion access or reproductive oppression, and replace it with a human rights foundation that would require the state to ensure every person's access to free reproductive decision-making.

Adopting a wider focus on reproductive oppression 
Some women's studies scholars like Greta Gaard argue that "choice" is a "scheme of omission" which means that it leaves many women out of the conversation, particular women of color, immigrant women, queer women, transgender women, and so on. In this vein, SisterSong Women of Colour Reproductive Health Collective, one of the founding coalitions, argued:One of the key problems addressed by reproductive justice is the isolation of abortion from other social justice issues that concern communities of color: issues of economic justice, the environment, immigrants' rights, disability rights, discrimination based on race and sexual orientation, and a host of other community-centered concerns. These issues directly affect an individual woman's decision-making process. By shifting the focus to reproductive oppression – the control and exploitation of women, girls, and individuals through our bodies, sexuality, labor, and reproduction – rather than a narrow focus on protecting the legal right to abortion, [we are] developing a more inclusive vision of how to build a new movement.As indicated above, the reproductive justice movement is defined in part by its opposition to "reproductive oppression", which the organization Asian Communities for Reproductive Justice (ACRJ)--one of the original groups to define and promote reproductive justice—defines as:The control and exploitation of women and girls through our bodies, sexuality, and reproduction is a strategic pathway to regulating entire populations that is implemented by families, communities, institutions, and society. Thus, the regulation of reproduction and exploitation of women's bodies and labor is both a tool and a result of systems of oppression based on race, class, gender, sexuality, ability, age and immigration status. This is reproductive oppression as we use the term.
By establishing reproductive justice as a counter to this form of oppression, advocacy groups like ACRJ highlight the movement's focus on broadening the reproductive health and rights framework to include the impact of social relations and socioeconomic conditions. Reproductive justice sought to address the failure to consider the differences among women, based on their social location (class, race, disability etc.) and how these delimit the "choices" available to them.  The founders of reproductive justice saw that despite having the legal access to options such as abortion, they were not able to exercise reproductive choices as easily as their more privileged White, middle-class counterparts. For them, reproductive politics was not simply about choice, but about justice. As a result, reproductive justice foreground the connection of reproductive issues and wider social justice concerns like community safety, violence, and the government's role in reproduction. For example, the right to parent in safe environments would encompass issues such as police brutality and the water crisis in Flint, Michigan. These issues are largely absent from pro-choice advocacy. Asian Communities for Reproductive Justice, recently renamed Forward Together, defines the concept as follows:
Reproductive Justice is the complete physical, mental, spiritual, political, economic, and social well-being of women and girls, and will be achieved when women and girls have the economic, social, and political power and resources to make healthy decisions about our bodies, sexuality, and reproduction for ourselves, our families, and our communities in all areas of our lives.
Reproductive Justice is therefore "based in the human right to make personal decisions about one's life, and the obligation of government and society to ensure that the conditions are suitable for implementing one's decisions". Thus, the focus is on structural and systemic changes that can support rights.

Intersectionality 
When defining reproductive justice, activists often reference the concept intersectionality, a broader framework used to analyze the various life experiences individuals may have as a result of the ways in which their identity categories, such as race, class, gender, and sexuality, interact with each other. Reproductive justice advocates use this framework to highlight how people who face greater societal oppression in their everyday lives as a result of their intersectional identities also face higher levels of oppression in their reproductive lives. This means that it is often harder for oppressed people to access healthcare due to factors such as education, income, geographic location, immigration status, and potential language barriers, among others. Loretta Ross, co-founder and National Coordinator of the SisterSong Women of Color Reproductive Justice Collective from 2005 to 2012, defines reproductive justice as a framework created by activist women of color to address how race, gender, class, ability, nationality, and sexuality intersect. Reproductive justice encompasses reproductive health and reproductive rights, while also using an intersectional analysis to emphasize and address the social, political, and economic systemic inequalities that affect women's reproductive health and their ability to control their reproductive lives.

The founders of the reproductive justice framework also defined it as being "purposefully controversial" because it centralizes communities of color. Advocates state that centering these communities pushes back against the "dehumanizing status quo of reproductive politics." By centering the needs and leadership of the most oppressed people instead of the majority, reproductive justice seeks to ensure that all people can create self-determined reproductive lives. The reproductive justice lens is therefore used to address issues related to abortion, contraception, immigration, welfare, HIV/AIDS, environmental justice, racism, indigenous communities, education, LGBTQ+ rights, and disability, among other issues impacting people's reproductive lives.

As a framework for research and practice 
Reproductive Justice is, simultaneously, a feminist framework, praxis, and theory that counters the individualism of the mainstream reproductive health and rights movements. It was successfully used as a conceptual framework for activism and sexual and reproductive health programmes and interventions long before it was used as a theoretical frame for research. It can provide a profoundly social and deeply politicised analytical framework for empirical research on sexual and reproductive matters but there is far less clarity on how it should be applied. Scholars have recently begun to address this oversight, for example, Morison recently published a paper in which she aims to "offer concrete analytical strategies for applying Reproductive Justice theory and to stimulate further thinking and discussion regarding how the theory might be fruitfully and rigorously used in qualitative research in psychology".

In the United States

Origins

Different ethnic gender norms 
Early notions of women's liberation focused largely on freedom from the Victorian Era gender roles. These roles placed white women in the cult of domesticity, confining them to the expectations of motherhood and home-maker, void of any autonomy separate from their husbands or families. Women whose partners or family members are opposed to abortion tend to have a negative impact. It may cause women to not seek the care that they want and need, and cause women to seek care in unconventional ways.

The feminine norms and restrictions did not apply the same exact way for Black women and other women of color. Black women were considered to be outside the cult of domesticity and many of its gender norms that were perceived by white people; as Stephanie Flores wrote in The Undergraduate Journal of the Athena Center for Leadership Studies at Barnard College, "Blacks were not perceived as feminine, but rather as less than human" but contraception was still socially unacceptable for Black women because it was their perceived duty to produce more slaves.

The social stigmas in place greatly impact how Black women are perceived from abortion. Women of color having more trouble finding supportive communities or people they can turn to for help or advice. Women of color tend to also have a more difficult time finding a good environment to raise their children, where they will be safe, cared for, and well educated.

Neither Black nor white women had been historically granted full bodily autonomy with regards to their reproductive health, but they experienced this lack of freedom differently, and thus emerged the need for a movement that was able to cater specifically to the unique experiences and challenges faced by Black women. Similarly, Latinx, Arab/Middle Eastern, Indigenous, and Asian/Pacific Islander women have all faced different gender norms based on their race/ethnicity. However, the gap in the US has always been widest between white women, who are the most privileged group, and Black women, who have been the most maligned.

Forced and coerced sterilization and birth control 
At the dawn of the mainstream women's rights movements in the United States, reproductive rights were understood to be the legal rights that concerned abortion and contraceptive measures like birth control. The predominantly white advocates and organizations fighting for reproductive rights during this era focused almost exclusively on these goals. This resulted in the widespread, long-lasting exclusion of Black women from mainstream women's rights movements.

The beginning of the birth control movement in the United States alienated Black women in many ways.  With mostly white leadership, advocates in this movement catered mainly to the needs of white women. Additionally, in the early 20th century, white nationalists spread the concept of "race suicide", the fear that white women using birth control would reduce the number of white babies being born, thus limiting the power and control of white people in the United States. This concept has been a driving force behind the history of forced and coerced sterilization of women of color around the world, including in the US. The most recent cases of non-consensual sterilization in the US occurred throughout the 20th century, targeting "women living with HIV, women who are ethnic and racial minorities, women with disabilities, and poor women, among others." Often, the "consent" for sterilization was obtained from women under distressing circumstances (i.e. during childbirth) or obtained without providing all of the necessary information regarding the sterilization. Other times, a woman's consent was not given, and the procedure was done when the woman thought she was receiving only a cesarean section. In many states, these sterilizations were publicly funded. Such sterilization efforts resulted in the near-elimination of some Native American tribes. According to Flores, The mainstream feminist movement recognized coerced sterilization as a problem for black women, but continued to argue for easier access to sterilizations and abortions for themselves. Their demands directly and negatively impacted black women as they failed to take into account the needs of black women for protection from hospitals and government officials who would otherwise force black women to limit their reproduction. The genocidal connotations and lack of consideration for forced sterilization in the birth control movement contributed to intersectional challenges faced by women of color. They also resulted in a movement of Black people against Black women's choice to use birth control or abortion, rather than producing more Black babies to build the community. This effectively divided the Black community. The birth control movement essentially espoused the idea that women could attain freedom and equality by receiving legal access to family planning services, which could help lift them out of poverty. While this may have been partially true for white women who were free of racist or classist discrimination, black women faced many more barriers that were blocking their way to liberation, by nature of being Black in such a racially unequal society. Margaret Sanger, a prominent contraceptive advocate and the first to coin the term "birth control" in the late nineteenth century, has been criticized for aligning with eugenicists in ways that perpetuated birth control as a method of population control. There are varying levels of agreement/disagreement with this criticism within the reproductive justice movement. In Killing the Black Body, Author Dorothy Roberts asserts that Sanger ultimately contributed significantly in the fight for contraception access but did so in a way that often shifted the focus away from reproductive autonomy and utilized eugenic ideas that were prominent at the time.

There is also a history of coercive promotion of birth control among women of color in the United States. Before their approval by the FDA, birth control pills were tested on Puerto Rican women who were not told they were participating in a clinical trial of little-tested medication, nor were they told about side effects that were occurring among their peers in the trial. Some women were not even told that the pills were meant to prevent pregnancy, and those who were told this were told it was 100% effective. Women in the trials were given doses ten times higher than what is actually needed to prevent pregnancy. Although a few trial participants died, they were not autopsied to discover if the drug was related to their deaths. More recently, women of color, women with low incomes, women in conflict with the law, and women who have used illicit drugs have been coerced into using long-acting reversible contraceptives (LARCs). Women have been given the choice between LARCs and jail, or have been told that they would lose their public benefits if they did not use LARCs. Medicaid has covered the implantation of LARCs, but not their removal, which has disproportionately affected women of color, who often experience poverty and rely on Medicaid. LARCS have also been disproportionately promoted to women of color. Many criticize these efforts as based in eugenics and seeking to curtail population growth among communities of color.

Anti-abortion advocates have used the history of forced and coerced sterilization and birth control to claim that abortion itself represents a eugenics conspiracy. The movement cites the high abortion rates among Black women and the presence of abortion clinics in predominantly Black neighborhoods as evidence. Its methods center on erecting billboards across the country with messages like "Black children are an endangered species" and "The most dangerous place for an African American is in the womb." Reproductive justice advocates respond by showing that Black women have higher abortion rates because they have higher unplanned pregnancy rates due to factors like disparities in healthcare and sex education. The fertility rate among Black communities is the same as among white communities, showing that Black populations are not in decline. Abortion clinics are intentionally cited in low-income neighborhoods to increase access, and economic disparities mean that many of these neighborhoods are predominantly Black. Author Dorothy Roberts says:Black women's wombs are not the main enemy of black children ... Racism and sexism and poverty are the main enemy of black children. [The billboard] doesn't highlight the issues behind why women are having so many abortions, it just blames them for doing it ... [These billboards] are essentially blaming black women for their reproductive decisions and then the solution is to restrict and regulate black women's decisions about their bodies.

Redefining reproductive rights

Women of color 
Even when topics of racial genocide were no longer at the forefront of the birth control conversation, reproductive freedom for Black women was still not a priority of the mainstream civil rights movement in America.While reproductive politics were central to the mainstream feminist movement, they were often not addressed in ways that represented the needs of women of color as well as white women. These gaps in both the civil rights movement and the women's rights movement shed light on the need for Black women's organizations that would be separate from the existing movements focused only on racial equality without addressing women's specific needs or only on gender equality without addressing Black women's specific needs.

The committee to End Sterilization Abuse (CESA) was an organization formed in 1977 that was specifically dedicated to addressing the forced sterilization of Black women in the US. CESA created a "working paper" that essentially served as an open letter to mainstream feminist activists called Sterilization Abuse: A task for the Women's Movement. This paper highlighted one of the biggest intersectional challenges Black women faced in their fight for reproductive rights. It explained how despite not being addressed in mainstream feminism's fight for reproductive freedom, forced sterilization is indeed an infringement on one's reproductive rights, and one that disproportionately affected black women over white women. Calling attention to this infringement on the reproductive freedom of Black women was an important step in leading to the expansion of reproductive politics in the US.

Many new reproductive health organizations for women of color were created in the 1980s and 1990s, including the National Black Women's Health Project, and they objected to the rhetoric employed by the mainstream reproductive rights movement to define the issue of abortion along the narrow political advocacy lines that figured in abortion disputes since the 1973 Roe v. Wade Supreme Court decision legalizing abortion in the US. These new women-of-color-led organizations felt that the term "choice" excluded minority women and "masked the ways that laws, policies and public officials punish or reward the reproductive activity of different groups of women differently." Activists for the rights of women of color subsequently expanded their attentions from a focus on unfair sterilization practices and high rates of teen pregnancy among women of color to include the promotion of a more inclusive platform to advance the rights and choices of all women.

The concept of reproductive justice was first articulated in June 1994 at a national pro-choice conference by an informal Black Women's Caucus that met at the Illinois Pro-Choice Alliance in Chicago. This caucus preceded the 1994 International Conference on Population and Development (ICPD) that took place two months later and produced the Cairo Programme of Action, which identified reproductive health as a human right. After Cairo, the Black women promoting the reproductive justice framework sought to adapt the human rights framework outlined by the ICPD to the United States' reproductive rights movement. They coined the term "reproductive justice," defining it at first as "reproductive health integrated into social justice" by using the moral, legal, and political language of human rights.

In 1997, 16 organizations representing and led by Indigenous, Asian/Pacific Islander, Black, and Latinx women, including women who had been involved in the Black Women's Caucus, came together to form the SisterSong Women of Color Reproductive Justice Collective in order to create a national movement for reproductive justice. Their website states that reproductive justice is a human right, is about access (not choice), and is about more than just abortion. They argue that reproductive justice can be achieved by examining power structures and intersectionality, joining across identities and issues, and putting the most marginalized groups at the center of advocacy. SisterSong spearheaded the push for a new, comprehensive reproductive justice movement as a more inclusive alternative to the "divisive" argument for women's rights that primarily emphasized access to contraception and the right to an abortion. The founders of SisterSong also felt that some of the pro-choice activists "seemed to be more interested in population restrictions than in women's empowerment".

As SisterSong spread the concept of reproductive justice, the framework gradually won increasing support and prominence in the discussion of women's rights and empowerment. The 2003 SisterSong National Women of Color Reproductive Health and Sexual Rights Conference popularized the term and identified the concept as "a unifying and popular framework" among the various organizations that attended. In 2004, Jael Silliman and coauthors published the first book on reproductive justice, Undivided Rights: Women of Color Organizing for Reproductive Justice. Moving forward, reproductive justice groups modeled some of their rhetoric after Dr. George Tiller, a late-term abortion provider who was assassinated in his church in Wichita, Kansas, in 2009. He coined the phrase "Trust Women", which was used to promote abortion rights by arguing that women should be trusted to make their own decisions. "Trust Women" became the name of an organization and conference based on women's reproductive rights. Building on his legacy and the popularity of this phrase, SisterSong and reproductive justice advocates adopted Trust Black Women as an organizing slogan and the name of a national coalition of Black-women-led organizations led by SisterSong and devoted to advancing reproductive justice for the Black community (TrustBlackWomen.org).

Over the decades since SisterSong's birth, the group has inspired and mentored the creation of dozens of women-of-color-led reproductive justice organizations across the country. Groups that promote women's rights such as the National Organization for Women and Planned Parenthood have increasingly adopted the language of reproductive justice in their advocacy work. The movement has increasingly entered mainstream spaces, as organizations such as Law Students for Reproductive Justice have arisen to promote women's human rights using the reproductive justice framework. In 2016, Hillary Clinton used the term reproductive justice during her campaign for the presidency.

Asian and Pacific Islander women were a part of the reproductive justice movement through organizing and advocating for the ending of oppressive practices against them. Their movement included ending the sexualized stereotypes of API women which resulted in them being treated as commodities. On the other hand, API communities asexualized API women and force them into conformity in the private sphere. The "model minority" myth painted API immigrants as wealthy and resourceful, while many API women worked low-wage jobs with no health insurance. In response, API women formed many successful organizations such as Asian Immigrant Women Advocates (AIWA), The Committee on South Asian Women, and Asian and Pacific Islanders for Choice (APIC).

Women in digital spaces 
Reproductive rights have also been redefined digitally. Moving beyond contradictions about women and technology and exploring the ways these contradictions can be challenged allows for better opportunities to take action.

On March 28, 2016, "Periods for Pence" pages were created on Facebook and Twitter to combat HEA 1337. Organizers like Laura Shanley rallied women online to contact Pence's office and provide information on their reproductive health. Women were ultimately using digital means to represent their bodies and band together as a team of multiple identities with unique, individual experiences.

Sites like the National Abortion and Reproductive Rights Action League help to engage women with political activism. For example, some sites share petitions and links for voting/contacting political leaders so women can get involved despite their busy lives.

Issues

Sex education 

Throughout the world, many people lack a quality understanding of sex education. Health Organizations should provide sex education including information and easy access services that can be used. This should include knowledge of choice about partners, choice about the timing, possible marriage, and knowledge of consent. According to The Pro-Choice Public Education Project, the US provides more funding towards abstinence-only sex education programs rather than comprehensive sex education programs. From 1996 through 2007, the US Congress committed over $1.5 billion to abstinence-only programs. When funding is not provided towards comprehensive sex education, students are not taught about how to prevent pregnancy and sexually transmitted diseases from occurring. Advocates for Youth discusses how abstinence-only education programs are not effective at delaying the initiation of sexual activity or reducing teen pregnancy. Instead, graduates of abstinence-only programs are more prone to engage sexual activities without know how to prevent pregnancy and disease transmission. Reproductive justice advocates call for comprehensive sex education to be available to all young people.

Birth control 
Reproductive justice advocates promote every individual's right to be informed about all birth control options and to have access to choosing whether to use birth control and what method to use. This includes advocacy against programs that push women of color, women on welfare, and women involved with the justice system to use LARCs. By providing women and trans people with knowledge about and access to contraception, the reproductive justice movement hopes to lower unwanted pregnancies and help people take control over their bodies.

Federal programs supported by reproductive justice activists date back to the Title X Family Planning program, which was enacted in the 1970s to provide low-income individuals with reproductive health services. Title X gives funding for clinics to provide health services such as breast and pelvic examinations, STD and cancer testing, and HIV counseling and education. These clinics are vital to low-income and uninsured individuals. Advocates for reproductive justice also aim to increase funding for these programs and increase the number of services that are funded.

Abortion access 
Advocates for reproductive justice such as SisterSong and Planned Parenthood believe that all women should be able to obtain a safe and affordable abortion if they desire one. Having safe, local, and affordable access to abortion services is a crucial part of ensuring high-quality healthcare for women (and for trans and gender non-conforming people who can get pregnant). Access to abortion services without restrictive barriers is believed to be a vital part of healthcare because "…induced abortion is among the most common medical procedures in the US…Nearly half of American women will have one or more in their lifetimes." These organizations point to studies that show that when access to abortion is prohibitive or difficult, abortions will inevitably be delayed, and performing an abortion 12 weeks or longer into the pregnancy increases the risks to women's health and raises the cost of procedures. The American Medical Association echoes the importance of removing barriers to obtaining an early abortion, concluding that these barriers increase the gestational age at which the induced pregnancy termination occurs, thereby also increasing the risk associated with the procedure.

Minority groups experience poverty and high rates of pregnancy due to a lack of available sex education and contraception. In addition, women from low income households are more likely to turn to unsafe abortion providers, and as a result, they are more likely to be hospitalized for complications related to the procedure than higher-income women are. Although abortions were made legal in the Roe v.s. Wade Supreme Court decision of 1973, many obstacles to women's access remain. Young, low-income, LGBTQ, rural, and non-white women experience the greatest hurdles in their efforts to obtain an abortion in many parts of the U.S. Obstacles to obtaining an abortion in the US include a lack of Medicaid coverage for abortions (except in the case of certain circumstances, such as life endangerment), restrictive state laws (such as those requiring parental consent for a minor seeking an abortion), and conscience clauses allowing medical professionals to refuse to provide women with abortions, related information, or proper referrals. Additional obstacles to access include a lack of safety for providers and patients at abortion facilities, the conservative, anti-abortion political legislators and the citizens that support them, and a lack of qualified abortion providers, especially in rural states.

Abortion access is especially challenging for women in prisons, jails, and immigrant detention centers. Proponents of reproductive justice argue that withholding access to abortion in these facilities can be seen as a violation of the 8th Amendment preventing cruel and unusual punishments. A survey presented in Contraception found a correlation between Republican-dominated state legislatures and severely restricted coverage for abortion. Many anti-abortion groups are actively working to chip away at abortion by enacting restrictions that prevent more and women from obtaining the procedure. The research concludes that full access is not available in all settings, and correctional settings should increase the accessibility of services for women.

Organizations that promote reproductive justice such as NOW and Planned Parenthood aim to provide increased access to safe abortions at a low cost and without external pressure. They advocate increasing insurance coverage for abortions, decreasing the stigma and danger attached to receiving an abortion, eliminating parental notification for teens, training more physicians and clinics to provide safe abortions, and creating awareness about abortion.

Maternity care 
Researchers have found that women of color face substantial racial disparities in birth outcomes. This is worst for black women. For example, black women are 3–4 times more likely to die from pregnancy-related causes than white women. While part of the issue is the prevalence of poverty and lack of healthcare access among women of color, researchers have found disparities across all economic classes. A black woman with an advanced degree is more likely to lose her baby than a white woman with less than a high school education. This is partially due to racial bias in the healthcare system; studies have found medical personnel less likely to believe black people's perceptions about their own pain, and many stories have surfaced of black women experiencing medical neglect within hospitals and dying from pregnancy complications that could have been treated. Researchers have also found that the stress of living as a person of color in a racist society takes a toll on physical health, a phenomenon that has been coined weathering. The extra stresses of pregnancy and labor on a weathered body can have fatal consequences.

Reproductive justice advocates assert the need to correct racial disparities in maternal health through systemic change within health care systems, and they also particularly advocate for access to midwifery model care. Midwifery care has strong roots in the ancient traditions of communities of color and is usually administered by fellow women, rather than doctors. Midwifery practitioners treat the individual as a whole person rather than an objectified body. Midwifery care involves trained professionals including midwives (who are medically trained to monitor and safeguard maternal, fetal, and infant health and deliver babies), doulas (who provide emotional and practical support and advocacy to mothers during pregnancy, labor, and postpartum, but do not have any medical training), and lactation consultants (who train and support mothers with lactation). Midwifery model care has been shown to improve birth outcomes, but is often not covered by health insurance and therefore only accessible to wealthier people. Reproductive justice groups advocate for access to midwifery model care not only to correct racial disparities in birth outcomes, but because they believe that every woman has the human right to give birth in any way she wishes, including a home birth or a midwifery model birth at a birthing center or hospital.

Sexual coercion

Reproductive justice also focuses on providing protection against sexual coercion, unwanted sexual activity that happens when a person is pressured, tricked, threatened or forced in a non-physical way, when it comes to domestic partners. Sexual coercion consists of, but is not limited, to: continuously asking for sexual favors until the desired answer is achieved, making a sexual partner think it is to late to change their mind, manipulation, threats that can jeopardize one's safety based on sexual preference or orientation, and stealthing. Sexual coercion between domestic partners has become a bigger issue in the United States. Sexual coercion has become a national problem. In 2014, there was research done by Susan Leahy that focuses on nonviolent nonconsensual sexual assault. Black women are victimized at an alarmingly higher rate than their counterparts. "17 percent of black women experienced some form of sexual coercion by their domestic partners. This has been a known issue since The Civil Rights, which women used this spotlight to fight for their rights over their bodies and fight against sexual misconduct against them.

Incarceration, immigrant detention, and reproductive justice.

Pregnancy, birth, and postpartum during incarceration
Women of color are disproportionately targeted by the criminal justice and immigrant detention systems, particularly women with low incomes or from other sectors of society with limited access to healthcare. A Rhode Island report showed that 84% of women in prison had been sexually active within three months of their arrest, but only 28% had used contraception. Newly incarcerated women are therefore at a higher risk of unintended pregnancy. Many of these pregnancies also become high risk due to substance use before incarceration and lack of prenatal care services both before and during incarceration, leading to preterm deliveries, spontaneous abortions, low-birthweight infants, preeclampsia, or fetal alcohol syndrome. During incarceration, many women report challenges in accessing appropriate prenatal, birthing, and postpartum care, sometimes with disastrous and even life-threatening results. Women have been denied medical attention when in labor, shackled during labor even against the requests of medical professionals, and refused postpartum doctors' visits after high-risk births. Shackling in five-point restraints (both wrists, both ankles, and across the belly) during pregnancy and postpartum has been known to cause issues like a miscarriage (if a woman trips and cannot break her fall with her hands) and can reopen stitches from a cesarean. Women also reported being automatically confined to isolation after birthing and separation from newborns, which increases the risk of postpartum depression. Breastfeeding and pumping milk have also been prohibited, which is detrimental to maternal and infant health and to mother-baby bonding. Advocates in several states have been fighting these policies, often using a reproductive justice framework, and several have won policy changes. Doula groups have also formed to provide care to incarcerated and detained women, often using a reproductive justice framework.

Diseases and other health conditions

Since 1980, the number of women in prison has tripled, leading to a high incidence of serious health concerns, including HIV, hepatitis C, and reproductive diseases. The rate of HIV is higher among incarcerated women than among incarcerated men, and it can be as much as one hundred times higher among incarcerated people than in the general population. The trend towards longer and heavier sentences has also led to greater health concerns, as many prisons, jails, and detention centers offer little accessibility to adequate medical care. Due to stigma, when incarcerated and detained people are given healthcare, it is often lower quality. Additionally, prisons and detention centers are increasingly being built on rural land, isolated from major resources for medical care. Two major areas of concern for reproductive justice in prisons are medical neglect and non-consensual prison intervention on a woman's right to reproduce.

Forced sterilization and contraceptions
Prisons have demonstrated high incidents of human rights violations. These include cases of medical neglect and forced sterilization. Acts of forced sterilizations have often been used to justify punishments for imprisoned women. These violations continue to occur due to limited public attention towards cases of prisoner dehumanization and injustice. This leads to greater helplessness as imprisoned women lose say in the treatment of their bodies. For example, prisons often perform forced hysterectomies on imprisoned women. Article 7 of the International Covenant on Civil and Political Rights established by the United Nations prohibits cruel, degrading, inhumane torture. The lifelong effects of forced sterilization as well as the unnecessary suffering due to untreated disease violates these treaties.

Women with disabilities are one of the minorities that are greatly impacted by the deprivation of reproductive rights. They often experience discrimination, limitations to the type of contraception they are given, and forms of sterilizations. Many women with disabilities are coerced into sterilizations that they never gave consent to, and many doctors oftentimes make this decision for women or even family members that give consent to proceed with the sterilization process for them. This is seen as a violation, torture, or abuse to many women around the world who are deprived from their right to make their own choice for their body. Women with disabilities are also deprived from the right to choose what kind of contraception they use. When women with disabilities are compared to women without disabilities, the type of contraception they are given in clinics are quite different. Women with disabilities are mostly given a contraception that is long acting and reversible, while those with no disabilities are given moderately effective methods. This is in part a result of lack of knowledge and experience with patients with disabilities. When taking into account the many forced sterilizations and discriminations against minority women, eugenics can also be a part of the reason why these discriminations occur against women with disabilities and others. In the United States, forced sterilizations have occurred for eugenic purposes since after World War II. California being one of the states that allowed forced sterilizations in the 1940s, especially on minority groups of women that had prominent unfavored genes. Institutions in California reported to have sterilized about 381 people, but later the sterilizations ceased due to little scientific proof to decrease the unfavored genetics. However, disabled women were still one of the few groups in 1954 to have sterilizations be performed after no proof of effectiveness was found. Forced sterilizations have been performed on people of color, immigrant Latino women, mentally disabled women, physically disabled women, women from low income, and many more in the United States. These women are all a part of one or more minority groups that were targeted for not having the ideal genes or to limit the population growth.

Separation of families
The criminal justice, child welfare, and immigrant detention systems frequently target and separate families with marginalized identities, which advocates say is a reproductive justice issue. The cash bail system incarcerates only people who have low incomes and cannot afford bail, which often means people of color. Due to the Adoption and Safe Families Act, parents can then lose all legal rights to their children if they have been incarcerated for 15 of the last 22 months, even if they are still awaiting trial. Both incarceration and immigrant detention separate children from competent parents who want them, which is often deeply traumatic and can result in children being placed in the foster care system, where the likelihood of poor healthcare and educational outcomes increases, as does the likelihood of future criminal justice involvement, and these outcomes are worst for children of color.

LGBTQ+ people 
Access to reproductive health services is more limited among the LGBTQ community than among heterosexuals. This is evident from the lower number of training hours that students going into the medical field receive on health problems faced by LGBTQ persons. Evidence also shows that once students complete training and become healthcare providers, they often adopt heteronormative attitudes towards their patients. In addition to lower educational standards and evident clinical prejudice against LGBTQ patients, there is also limited health research that is specifically applicable to LGBTQ community.

Like cisgender heterosexual people, LGBTQ people still need access to sex education, sexual and reproductive healthcare such as testing and treatment for sexually transmitted diseases, birth control, and abortion. Despite myths to the contrary, LGBTQ people can still face unintended pregnancies. Many face increased risk for certain sexually transmitted diseases, such as HIV. Access to fertility treatment and adoption is also a reproductive justice issue for many LGBTQ people who want to raise children. Likewise, prejudice against LGBTQ people is a reproductive justice issue impacting their personal bodily autonomy, safety, and ability to create and support healthy families. Self-determined family creation is a human right for all people, according to reproductive justice. Trans people share all of these reproductive justice issues; in addition, access to gender-affirming hormones is considered a reproductive issue necessary to their personal bodily autonomy. Trans people in the US, especially trans people of color, face the most severe prejudice and violence directed toward the LGBTQ community. Black trans women in particular are being murdered at alarming rates.

Economic justice 
Due to systemic racism, women of color in the US earn considerably less than white men and also substantially less than white women or men of color. This impacts their ability to afford birth control, reproductive healthcare, and abortion, as well as their ability to have as many children as they want and raise their families with adequate resources. Due to economic constraints, women of color are more likely than other women to feel they need to abort pregnancies they want. They are also more likely to live in poverty because they have more children than they can easily afford to care for. Women with low incomes are more likely to rely on state social supports, which often further limit their access to birth control, reproductive health services, abortion, and high-quality maternity care such as midwifery services.

In 1977, the United States federal government passed the Hyde Amendment, which eliminated federal Medicaid which funded abortions and reproductive services to low-income women. This caused low-income women further barriers in accessing reproductive health services, and meant that they would have to "forgo other basic necessities in order to pay for their abortion, or they must carry their unplanned pregnancy to term".  The amendment results in the discrimination of poor women who "often need abortion services the most" and have "reduced access to family planning, and experience higher rates of sexual victimization". Due to systemic racism in the United States, women of color "disproportionately rely on public sources of health care", so the Hyde amendment impacted these women substantially.

Environmental justice 
Because reproductive justice is tied to community well-being, Kathleen M. de Onı's 2012 article in Environmental Communication argues that reproductive justice should be understood alongside environmental justice and climate change. Reproductive justice advocates organize for environmental justice causes because issues like unhealthy drinking water and toxins in beauty products can impact physical and reproductive health and children's health. The Flint Michigan water crisis is often cited as an example of this because a low-income community primarily composed of people of color was forced to use toxic drinking water, a situation that advocates say likely would not have been inflicted upon a wealthier, whiter community. Environmental reproductive justice was built on the premise to ensure that women's reproductive health and capabilities are not limited by environmental pollution.

Environmental justice is a response to environmental racism. "Environmental racism refers to environmental policies, practices, or directives that differentially affect or disadvantage (whether intentionally or unintentionally) individuals, groups, or communities based on race or colour". The Environmental justice movement began in 1982, in Warren County, North Carolina. It was born out of protests that occurred in response to a polychlorinated biphenyls landfill, which was located in Warren County, "a rural area in northeastern North Carolina with a majority of poor, African-American residents". Due to the potential for groundwater contamination, there was an immense backlash from residents and "protesters argued that Warren County was chosen, in part, because the residents were primarily poor and African-American". The protests resulted in 500 arrests, but the landfill was unable to be stopped.

An example of environmental racism that shows the enactment of environmental justice and reproductive justice is the Dakota access pipeline and protests at Standing Rock. The Standing Rock Sioux and other indigenous tribes have been protesting the construction of the Dakota access pipeline and subsequent contamination of the surrounding waters since April 2016.

Immigration and reproductive justice

Reproductive justice includes the right to exercise autonomy over family structures and the right to reproduce. Oftentimes, deportation and immigration policy can affect family planning and structure in a fundamental way - if one parent is deported, it can lead to the restriction of a family's income and place an increased burden on a single parent. Additionally, being separated from a parent can lead to the traumatization of children.

Additionally, Immigration Customs Enforcement (ICE) has been criticized for the practice of forced sterilization of immigrant women in the custody of private detention facilities. Nurse Dawn Wooton, the whistleblower who brought attention to the lack of informed consent of immigrant patients at Irwin Country Detention Center, observed that "these immigrant women, I don't think they really, totally, all the way understand this is what's going to happen depending on who explains it to them."

Immigrant Latina women are often stereotyped as taking advantage of the opportunity to bear children in the U.S. to benefit from their children's citizenship. This leads to the infringement of many health care benefits and reproductive health care rights. Latina Immigrant women also often have to face poverty since without legal status, they do not have many work opportunities here in the U.S which can interfere with child caregiving and the reproductive health of the mother. Furthermore, the immigration system in the United States infringes reproductive rights from women that are detained in immigration facilities. Women are either separated from their children by force, denied access to reproductive health care, or denied abortions. Immigrant women with legal status also face discrimination and fear, they live with fear that if they apply for government assistance to properly care for their children, their legal status will be negatively impacted.

Ability and reproductive justice

Worldwide, women with disabilities are sterilized significantly higher than the general population. The United States has a history of forced sterilization of people with disabilities - in the 1900s, more than 60,000 people were forcibly sterilized across the US due to a widespread belief in eugenics. In recent history, several practices in the US aimed at the sterilization of people with disabilities have been regarded with controversy. In 2007, "The Ashley Treatment" referred to a medical procedure in which parents of a disabled child elected for their daughter to undergo a hysterectomy and the removal of breast bud tissue, as well as hormone treatment that stunted her development.

Racial Justice and Reproductive Justice

Racism in the medical field can play a large role in determining a patient's access to safe and quality medical care. Within the US, a CDC report found that black women and American Indian/Alaskan Native women had a higher pregnancy-related mortality ratio (PRMR) than their white counterparts, at 3.2 and 2.3 percent respectively. Additionally, this study revealed that the PRMR for college-educated black women is over five times higher than the PRMR for white women with the same level of educational attainment. A national survey of five common causes of maternal mortality found that black women were more likely than white women to die as a result of the same medical conditions.

Reagan McDonald-Mosley, chief medical officer for Planned Parenthood Federation of America, discussed the extent to which racial inequity contribute to black women's experience with maternal mortality. "It tells you that you can't educate your way out of this problem. You can't health-care-access your way out of this problem. There's something inherently wrong with the system that's not valuing the lives of black women equally to white women."Black women face both the consequences of medical professionals dismissing pain and health concerns based on gender and race. One study found that 50% of white medical students believed myths such as that black individuals had a higher level of pain tolerance than white individuals, or that African-American patients skin is thicker than white patients skin. These myths lead to false diagnoses and dismissal of patient pain. Additionally, studies show that women's health concerns are often dismissed in medical offices - one study found that women who went to the emergency room for abdominal pain had an average wait time 33% longer than their male counterparts. One study suggested that women are 50% less likely to receive pain medication after surgery compared to their male counterparts. Black women fall at the intersection of biases against both black and female patients, which can result in reproductive health issues being taken less seriously.

Socioeconomic issues and reproductive oppression 
It is not possible to describe every reproductive justice issue on this webpage, as reproductive justice includes and encompasses many other movements across the globe. The organization Asian Communities for Reproductive Justice, one of the key groups to define and promote reproductive justice, says that advocates of reproductive justice support a diversity of issues they consider necessary for women and trans people to make reproductive decisions free of constraint or coercion. These enabling conditions include access to reliable transportation, health services, education, childcare, and positions of power; adequate housing and income; elimination of health hazardous environments; and freedom from violence and discrimination.  Because of the broad scope of the reproductive justice framework, reproductive justice activists are involved in organizing for immigrant rights, labor rights, disability rights, LGBTQ rights, sex workers' rights, economic justice, environmental justice, an end to violence against women and human trafficking, and more.

International

United Nations involvement 
Under the umbrella of the United Nations, there are several entities whose objectives relate to or promote reproductive justice. Among them, the Convention on the Elimination of All Forms of Discrimination Against Women emphasizes the rights of women to reproductive health and to choose "the number and spacing" of their children, in addition to access to the resources that would allow them to do so. The Convention Against Torture and Other Cruel, Inhuman, or Degrading Treatment "has been interpreted to include denial of family planning services to women." The United Nations Committee on the Elimination of Racial Discrimination has also been involved with the reproductive justice movement, such as when SisterSong's Executive Director presented them with a shadow report written by SisterSong, the Center for Reproductive Rights, and the National Latina Institute for Reproductive Health in 2014. It described the US crisis in maternal mortality among mothers of color as a human rights issue, and the UN committee adopted all of the report's recommendations.

The United Nations also sponsors conferences and summits with the subject of the empowerment of women, and these events have historically advanced the reproductive justice movement. The International Conference on Population and Development is the primary example.

Conferences in Cairo and Beijing 
The United Nations International Conference on Population and Development (ICPD) that took place in Cairo, Egypt in 1994 marked a "paradigm shift" to a set of policies on population that placed a high priority on the sexual and reproductive rights of women. Prior to the ICPD, international efforts to gauge population growth and to produce approaches that addressed its challenges focused on "strict and coercive" policy that included compulsory birth control and preferential access to health services by people who had been sterilized. The Programme of Action produced at the 1994 Cairo conference has been "heralded a departure from coercive fertility strategies" by insisting on the "fundamental rights of reproductive self determination and reproductive health care" and provided the ideological inspiration for grassroots organizations such as SisterSong in the United States to launch a movement for reproductive justice.

The United Nations Fourth World Conference on Women in Beijing followed the ICPD a year later, taking place in 1995, and producing a Platform for Action that advocated for the complete empowerment of all women. It charged states with the duty of ensuring the human rights of all women, among them the right to sexual and reproductive healthcare. The Beijing Platform for Action also promoted reproductive justice by calling on nations to reexamine laws that punished women for undergoing abortions.

Millennium Development Goals 
The Millennium Declaration of September, 2000 and the eight Millennium Development Goals (MDGs) that emerged as a result of the declaration built on the framework for sexual and reproductive health rights the ICPD had put forth five years earlier. The third and fifth MDGs, to promote gender equality and empower women and to improve maternal health, respectively, embody the principles of reproductive justice through "the promotion of healthy, voluntary, and safe sexual and reproductive choices for individuals and couples, including such decisions as those on family size and timing of marriage." Indeed, the Outcome Document of the 2005 World Summit reiterates the connection between the Millennium Development Goals and their support of the many social factors that promote reproductive justice by committing the participating countries to reproductive health as related to the fulfillment of all eight Millennium Development Goals. Advocates of reproductive justice have noted that by extension, reproductive justice is critical to include in strategies to meet the MDGs.

U.S. foreign policy 
Organizations that promote reproductive justice have criticized several United States policies that aim to remedy international issues of reproductive health. Below are just a few examples:

The Mexico City Policy, also known by some critics as the Global Gag Rule, and the related Helms Amendment to the Foreign Assistance Act, are controversial US foreign policies that pertain to reproductive justice outside the US. The Helms Amendment prevents the expenditure of United States foreign aid funds on services related to abortion, while the Mexico City Policy prevents any NGOs funded by the United States from using their resources, even independently raised funds, for services related to abortion. This means that any organization which provide surgical or chemical abortions, counsel individuals that abortion is a choice available to them, or participate in advocacy for the expansion of abortion rights would be ineligible for financial assistance from the United States. The Mexico City Policy in particular has been so controversial that since its establishment in President Reagan's second term, it has been rescinded by every Democratic president to take office at the end of a Republican president's term, only to be reinstated by each Republican president to take office at the end of a Democratic president's term. With each policy change, NGOs have to reevaluate how to best support the reproductive health of marginalized women around the world in terms of both resources and bodily autonomy. Although the Mexico City Policy and Helms Amendment each only affect the right to abortion in theory, reproductive justice advocates argue that these policies have the side effect of crippling organizations that address other important issues such as prenatal healthcare, access to other forms of contraception, and STD screening and treatment.

The President's Emergency Plan for AIDS Relief (PEPFAR) is another contentious American program related to funding initiatives for global reproductive health. The purpose of the program is to combat the global HIV/AIDS pandemic, but agencies such as the Center for Health and Gender Equity (CHANGE) have called its methods and effectiveness into question.  Critics say that it gives higher priority in funding distribution to faith-based organizations, including some "with little or no relevant international development experience" and some which promote abstinence instead of utilizing effective prevention methods. This policy approach, which has been nicknamed the ABC—Abstinence, Be faithful, Condom-use— poses a challenge to reproductive justice. Advocates hold that such policies marginalize groups of people such as LGBTQ persons who may be discriminated against, as well as women who have been raped, for whom "abstention is not an option." Although these organizations recognize the gains made by US aid as a whole, they argue that the rigid structure of the PEPFAR funding hinders a holistic, community-appropriate strategy to reduce HIV/AIDS infections, and they contend that the program is "laden with earmarks and restrictions from Washington that eliminate discretion for making funding decisions based on local realities and restrict alignment with European counterparts."

Another policy that has been condemned by reproductive justice advocates is the Anti-Prostitution Loyalty Oath (APLO) produced in 2003. Required by the United States to grant funding to non-governmental organizations that work to reduce the burden of HIV/AIDS internationally, this oath pledges to oppose sex trafficking and prostitution. Organizations that promote the empowerment of women, such as the International Women's Health Coalition, maintain that the oath is "stigmatizing and discriminatory" and that the groups of people opposed by the policy are precisely those who need help combating HIV/AIDS.

North America

Canada

Coerced sterilizations of Indigenous women in Canada 
In the early 20th century, it was legal in Alberta (1928–1972) and British Columbia (1933–1973) to perform reproductive sterilizations under the Sexual Sterilization Act. It was not until the 1970s that this legislation was repealed. However, the damage done towards Indigenous women is irreversible and has continued in the decades after the 1970s. The start of coerced sterilization began with the eugenics movement in the early 20th century and many Canadians, at the time, were in favour of this act. In Canada, it began with the idea of population control, however, it was disproportionally targeting Indigenous people, specifically Indigenous women and their right to reproduction. Many Indigenous women were not clearly informed of the tubal ligation procedure and believed it was a reversible form of birth control, when in fact, it was permanent.

A report was released in 2017 which highlighted the coerced tubal ligations inflicted on Indigenous women at the Saskatoon Health Region. In the report, Indigenous women who underwent tubal ligation surgery described the experience as making them feel, "invisible, profiled, and powerless". Many Indigenous women also stated that they felt pressured into signing consent forms for the procedure while they were still in labour or in operating rooms. This report recommended a nationwide study be conducted in order to accurately understand how many Indigenous women were affected by this. However, within the scope of the original study, the class, region, and race of the individual was found to play a role in the incidence of coerced sterilization. In 2017, the Saskatoon Health Region issued a formal apology for its involvement in the coerced sterilization of Indigenous women, and acknowledged that racism was a factor in said involvement. Coerced sterilizations were still occurring in Canada, as recently as 2018.  Additionally, lawsuits have been filed against multiple provincial governments by Indigenous women who underwent coerced sterilizations.

Migrant Women and Temporary Farm Workers in Canada 
Thousands of temporary farm workers, including many women, migrate to Canada through the Seasonal Agricultural Workers Program (SAWP). This program is  part of Canada's Temporary Foreign Worker Program (TFWP). Researchers studying migrant women who enter into British Columbia, Canada through this program found that they face unique barriers that inhibit their bodily autonomy and freedom to make choices surrounding their sexual health through "state-level policies and practices, employer coercion and control, and circumstances related to the structure of the SAWP". These women are impacted by many factors that contribute to their marginalization, including precarious legal status, lack of access to health care services, poverty, knowledge and language barriers, and job insecurity.

Utilizing a reproductive justice framework to analyze this issue, researchers shift the focus from "abortion rights and sexual freedom" to governmental processes that inhibit access for women to be able to make choices that are "safe, affordable, and accessible". Women in SAWP are highly vulnerable due to the program's legal restrictions, which results in a limited access to social programs or services, labour rights and health care services.

As a result, migrant women in SAWP take part in "everyday" forms of resistance to injustices and oppression. Rather than large scale forms of protest or objection, tactics to resist these forms of oppression are more subtle. Forms of resistance for these women often involve private disobedience of restrictive regulations, informing the media anonymously of injustices, finding and accessing forms of birth control or reproductive health services even when discouraged from doing so, forging relationships, and building a community as well as seeking the aid of advocacy groups.

South America

Restriction on abortion access and birth control 
South America has some of the rates of unsafe abortions in the world - for every 100 live births, 39 unsafe abortions take place. Additionally, 45% of the women who die from complications due to an unsafe abortion are under the age of 24. Reproductive healthcare in South America has become a heated political issue, with a rise in conservative and religious leadership contributing to a restriction in access to healthcare and reproductive health education. Restricted access to both contraceptives and abortion services leads to a high maternal mortality rate, while limited education leads to high rates of teen pregnancy.

Safe Abortion Information Hotlines 
Access to abortion in South America ranges between individual countries and within cities. Some places - such as Uruguay, Cuba, and Puerto Rico - allow abortion access before the 12th-14th week of pregnancy. Other locations restrict abortion completely, such as Chile, El Salvador, and Honduras. Throughout the rest of Latin America access to abortion is permitted only under restricted circumstances, which can result in women undergoing unsafe procedures to terminate pregnancies. One study examined the impact of a safe abortion information hotlines (SAIH) in five countries (Chile, Argentina, Ecuador, Peru, and Venezuela). These hotlines, founded by reproductive rights activists, emphasized the facilitation of accurate, factual information regarding pregnancy termination and how to safely seek an abortion.

Africa

Maternal Mortality Rates and Healthcare 
Sub-saharan Africa has high rates of unsafe abortions - around 6.2 million each year, which result in 15,000 preventable deaths. Religious values can sometimes create social barriers to accessing abortion, particularly in African countries that practice Islam or Christianity. Additionally, even in countries that do not entirely restrict abortion, laws that permit access to abortion under specific circumstances can increase health complications and women seeking unsafe abortions.

Female Genital Mutilation 
Female genital mutilation

Female Genital Mutilation (FGM) refers to the "partial or total removal of external female genitalia or other injury to the female genital organs for non-medical reasons." This procedure is practiced in 27 countries in Africa, and can lead to long-lasting health impacts for individuals who undergo cutting. FGM can result in negative health consequences in the long run, which can impact daily function and reproductive health. The World Health Organization (WHO) mentions the inherent inequality with FGM below: "FGM is recognized internationally as a violation of the human rights of girls and women. It reflects deep-rooted inequality between the sexes, and constitutes an extreme form of discrimination against women. It is nearly always carried out on minors and is a violation of the rights of children. The practice also violates a person's rights to health, security and physical integrity, the right to be free from torture and cruel, inhuman or degrading treatment, and the right to life when the procedure results in death."

Asia

China's One-Child policy 

China's one-child policy was part of a program to regulate population growth. This policy, which was implemented in 1979, placed fees on parents seeking to have children, and resulted in forced use of contraceptive devices by 80% of Chinese women in the 1980s. The One-child policy also discouraged single motherhood due to the associated high fees placed on a single person.

As a result of the one-child policy, researchers have noted a significant difference in the ratio of male children versus female children born. The Canadian Broadcasting Corporation describes potential ramifications of this increased ratio:"Because of a traditional preference for baby boys over girls, the one-child policy is often cited as the cause of China's skewed sex ratio [...] Even the government acknowledges the problem and has expressed concern about the tens of millions of young men who won't be able to find brides and may turn to kidnapping women, sex trafficking, other forms of crime or social unrest."Asia: In Southeast Asia, Timorese women still face many struggles, they are still fighting for quality and equal reproductive rights. There is still a lot of violence against women, meaning they are still fighting for gender equality. Many Timorese citizens identify as Catholic, almost ninety-five percent, which may have an impact on their rights and sexual health choices. Research has shown that in this town, many women are having sex in order to become pregnant, however many of the men were partaking in sexual relations in order to fulfill their sexual desires. Both genders hardly acknowledged pleasure for the women. The women do as they are told, and if their husband wants sex, it is their job to fulfill his needs.

Interventions addressing reproductive injustice

Women on Waves 
Women on Waves is a Dutch non-profit organization that utilizes the principal of international waters to combat restrictive abortion laws around the globe. Women on Waves travels to different countries with strict abortion restrictions and brings patients 12 miles off shore, the distance required to avoid penal restrictions in a country. This organization utilizes international waters as a loophole to provide reproductive autonomy to women who would otherwise be unable to access safe abortion.

Comprehensive Sex Education Policy 
Many reproductive justice organizations advocate for standardized and informative sexual health education in schools around the world. In the US, sexual health education can often be a controversial and politicized topic; this can result in some students in conservative states receiving misinformation or in the deliberate exclusion of curriculum that addresses key aspects of sexuality and reproductive health. Ensuring that sexual health curriculum is standardized and medically accurate would likely result in fewer unwanted pregnancies, STI rates, and overall provide individuals with the resources necessary to make informed decisions about their reproductive health.

See also 

 Black feminism
 Choice USA
 Compulsory sterilization
 Health disparities
 imMEDIAte Justice Productions
 INCITE! Women of Color Against Violence
 Intersectionality theory
 National Women's Health Network

References

Sources 

 
 
 
 
 
 
 
 
 
 
 
 
 
 
 
 
 
  Archived book from 1920 New York City: McGraw-Hill Education
 
 
 
 
 
 
 
 
 
 What is the Evidence? San Francisco: AIDS Policy Research Center & Center for AIDS Prevention Studies, University of California

External links 
 Forward Together (formerly Asian Communities for Reproductive Justice)
 California Latinas for Reproductive Justice
 SPARK! Reproductive Justice NOW
 Black Women for Reproductive Justice
 Colorado Organization for Latina Opportunity and Reproductive Rights
 National Asian Women's Health Organization
 National Latina Institute for Reproductive Health
 Forward Together (formerly Asian Communities for Reproductive Justice)
 Loretta Ross Papers at Smith College Special Collections

Activism
Intersectional feminism
Community organizing
Feminist theory
Women's rights
Feminism and health
Feminism and the family
Midwifery
Race and society
Feminist terminology